Robert Franklin Deuell, known as Bob Deuell (born 11 March 1950) 
is a physician from Greenville, Texas, and a former Republican member of the Texas Senate. He entered office in 2003 and represented the ten counties of Senate District 2 in the northeastern portion of the state. His term ended in 2015.

Deuell was narrowly unseated in the runoff election held on May 27, 2014; he polled 17,930 (49.6 percent) to intraparty challenger Bob Hall's 18,230 (50.4 percent). Deuell had led a three-candidate field in the primary on March 4, with 23,847 votes (48.5 percent). Because he fell short of a majority, he was placed in the runoff with the number-two candidate, Bob Hall, who in the primary polled 19,085 votes (38.8 percent). The remaining 6,240 votes (12.7 percent) went to the third candidate, Mark Thompson.

Background

Deuell, was educated at George Mason University in Fairfax County, Virginia, and the Medical College of Virginia. He is a partner in Primary Care Associates in Greenville, Texas. He is a member of the American Medical Association and Texas Medical Association. He is certified by the American Board of Family Medicine.

Legislative history 
During the Seventy-ninth Texas Legislature (2005), Deuell passed legislation to help ensure firefighters and other first responders who contract diseases in the line of duty receive the benefits they deserve (Senate Bill 310), created a statewide stroke emergency plan with the Texas Stroke Act (Senate Bill 330), authorized a medical dispatch program for rural areas (Senate Bill 523) and set up a Medicaid buy-in program for the working disabled (Senate Bill 565). Deuell also worked to ensure passage of bills dealing with issues such as education, transportation, lawsuit reform and family issues.

In the Eightieth Texas Legislature Senator Deuell was tapped by Lt. Governor David Dewhurst to carry Jessica's Law legislation, aimed at protecting society's most vulnerable population from child predators. Governor Rick Perry signed this bill into law on July 17, 2007.  Deuell also worked to advance issues as diverse as Medicaid reform and incentives programs to attract film and television production to Texas. For his work in this Session, Deuell was named as one of Texas Monthly's Best Legislators.

In 2013, Deuell co-authored legislation that would require abortion providers to abide by the same regulations as ambulatory surgical centers. Critics characterized the bill as a TRAP law that would enact a "virtual ban on abortion in Texas."

Leadership while in Senate 

In addition, Deuell was selected by Lieutenant Governor David Dewhurst to serve on the Senate Select Committee on Water Policy. He was a vice-chair of the Rural Caucus.  Senator Deuell is a former chair of the Senate Republican Caucus.

Election history

Most recent elections

2014

2010

2006

Previous elections

2002

2000

References

External links
Senate of Texas - Senator Bob Deuell official TX Senate website 
bobdeuell.org official campaign website
Project Vote Smart - Senator Robert E. 'Bob' Deuell (TX) profile
Follow the Money - Bob Deuell
2006 2004 2002 2000 campaign contributions
Texas Monthly's 10 Best and Worst Belo Blog, June 2007
Bois d'Arc Dixieland Band

1950 births
Living people
People from Greenville, Texas
Republican Party Texas state senators
George Mason University alumni
Medical College of Virginia alumni
Physicians from Texas
21st-century American politicians